Nikola Paunović (Serbian Cyrillic: Никола Пауновић; born 25 July 1985, in Kragujevac, Serbia) is a Serbian singer and television personality. He came to media attention as one of sixteen contestants on the B92's Operacija trijumf, Balkan version of Endemol's Fame Academy and Spanish Operación Triunfo. As one of four members of OT Band, he took part in Beovizija 2009, Serbian selection for Eurovision 2009, with the song "Blagoslov za kraj", and the band placed second in the final.

Discography

Solo singlovi
 2010: "Nepozvan" – (Suncane skale in Herceg Novi, Montenegro)
 2011: "Odlazim od tebe" (feat. Cvija)

OT Band singles
 2009: "Blagoslov za kraj" (feat. Kaya)
 2009: "Strpi se još malo" (cover of Take That's Patience)
 2009: "Zaboravi"   (feat. Karolina Goceva)

References

External links 
 Nikola Paunović at the Operacija trijumf official website
 Nikola Paunović at the Poznate ličnosti 

1985 births
Living people
Musicians from Kragujevac
Serbian baritones
Serbian pop singers
Serbian television personalities
Parovi